Lindau is a Landkreis (district) in Swabia, Bavaria, Germany; its capital is the city of Lindau. It is bounded by (from the east and clockwise) the district of Oberallgäu, Austria (federal state of Vorarlberg), Lake Constance and the state of Baden-Württemberg (districts of Bodensee and Ravensburg).

History

The city of Lindau became a Free Imperial City in the 13th century; it was directly subordinate to the emperor. The rural areas around Lindau were the property of monasteries or tiny counties, that rose and fell in the region. When Napoleon gained influence in the area, all these entities were dissolved in the German Mediatisation. Lindau fell to Bavaria.

The district of Lindau was established in 1938. After the Second World War it became — like the Rhenish Palatinate — part of the French zone of occupation, while the rest of Bavaria was under American occupation. In 1955 the district was reincorporated into Bavaria, unlike the Rhenish Palatinate. The city of Lindau, which had been an urban district, became a part of the rural district in 1972.

Geography

In the southwest the district borders Lake Constance, more precisely its eastern part known as Obersee. To the north the countryside rises to the hills of the western Allgäu mountains.

Coat of arms
The coat of arms displays:
 the blue and white checked pattern of Bavaria
 a lime tree symbolising the city of Lindau ("lime tree" is Linde in German)
 the arms of the counts of Montfort
 a blue wavy line symbolising Lake Constance

Towns and municipalities

References

External links

Landkreis Lindau (German)

 
Districts of Bavaria